Caroline of Austria can refer to:
 Maria Carolina of Austria (1752–1814), Queen of Naples
 Archduchess Marie Caroline of Austria (1801–1832), Crown Princess of Saxony
 Caroline Augusta of Bavaria (1792–1873), Empress of Austria